Alibey Lagoon is a salty lagoon (liman) on the Black Sea coast of Tatarbunary Raion of Odessa Oblast, Ukraine. The lagoon is originated from the old mouth of the Khadzhyder River. The length of the lagoon is 15 km, width 11 km, area 72 km2. The depth is 2.5 m.

The lagoon is separated from the sea by sandbar. It is connected through the Kurudiol Lagoon with the Burnas Lagoon on the south east, with the Karachaus Lagoon and Shahany Lagoon on the south west. Earlier, the Khadzhyder River inflowed to the lagoon, but now the river inflows to the Khadzhyder Lagoon, which separated from the Alibey Lagoon by dam.

History 
Between 1840 and 1856, nearly 4 million tons of salt were extracted from the lake. Following the 1856 Treaty of Paris (1856), settled the Crimean War (1853-1856),  Russia had to return to Moldova a strip of land from southwest Bessarabia (known as Cahul, Bolgrad and Ismail). As a result of this territorial loss, Russia had no access to the mouths of the Danube, and the exploitation of the salt was stopped.

Following the Treaty of Berlin (1878), Romania was forced to return Southern Bessarabia to Russia. After that, Russians did not resume the salt extraction from the lake.

Sources
 Starushenko L.I., Bushuyev S.G. (2001) Prichernomorskiye limany Odeschiny i ih rybohoziaystvennoye znacheniye. Astroprint, Odessa, 151 pp. 
 Information Sheet on Ramsar Wetlands — Shagany-Alibei-Burnas Lakes System

Tuzly Lagoons